Lizzie Borden is the sixth and best known opera by American composer Jack Beeson, commissioned by the Ford Foundation. The libretto by Kenward Elmslie after a scenario by Richard Plant is based on the real-life case of Lizzie Borden.

It was premiered on March 25, 1965, by the New York City Opera conducted by Anton Coppola and subsequently released on record.  The roughly two-hour opera is in three acts and an epilogue and is published by Boosey & Hawkes.

Roles

Synopsis
The plot is a dramatic retelling of the famed double axe murders of the stepmother and the father of the title character in Fall River, Massachusetts.  However a great number of dramatic changes are made for effectiveness on the stage.

References

External links
Lizzie Borden at North American Works Directory

English-language operas
Operas
1965 operas
Operas set in the United States
Operas based on real people
Operas by Jack Beeson
Opera world premieres at New York City Opera
Operas set in the 19th century
Cultural depictions of Lizzie Borden